Senecio transmarinus is a sometimes straggling member of the flowering plants Asteraceae and species of the genus Senecio a perennial herb 
that grows on the higher elevations of the Rwenzori Mountains in Uganda. It is also found in Rwanda and the Democratic Republic of the Congo. The inflorescences consist of several flowerheads with large yellow ray florets.

Description
Sometimes straggling and sometimes straight and found in the heathbelt and "alpine zone" between 3,000 and 4,200 meters (9,800 to 14,000 feet), Senecio transmarinus plants are much larger at lower altitudes than at the higher altitudes.

Stems and leaves Stems 30 to 240 centimeters (12 to 94 inches) tall and are mostly without hairs.  Leaves at the base are 3 to 8 centimeters (1 to 3 inches) long, a measurement which includes the petiole, and 1 to 2 centimeters wide.  Leaves are lobed and somewhat waxy or sparsely hairy and sometimes purple on the bottom.

Flowers "Inflorescences with several flower heads with striking large yellow ray florets" in clusters of 1 to many, each with 6 to 12 yellow ray florets and 5-veined disc yellow disc florets.

Fruits Achenes 4 to 5 millimeters long and hairless; pappus 5 to 8 millimeters long.

References

External links

Flora of the Democratic Republic of the Congo
Flora of Rwanda
Flora of Uganda
transmarinus